The Mactaggart Baronetcy, of King's Park in the City of Glasgow, is a title in the Baronetage of the United Kingdom. It was created on 2 February 1938 for John Mactaggart. He was a housing expert and the co-founder of the building firm Mactaggart & Mickel. The second Baronet was managing director of Mactaggart & Mickel. The third Baronet was chairman of the Society for Individual Freedom.

Mactaggart baronets, of King's Park (1938)
Sir John Mactaggart, 1st Baronet (1867–1956)
Sir John Auld Mactaggart, 2nd Baronet (1898–1960)
Sir Ian Auld Mactaggart, 3rd Baronet (1923–1987) unlocked
Sir John Auld Mactaggart, 4th Baronet (born 1951)

See also
Fiona Mactaggart, former MP, daughter of 3rd baronet / sister of 4th

Notes

External links
Short biography of Sir John Mactaggart, 1st Baronet at The Glasgow Story

Mactaggart
History of Glasgow